Battles Wharf, formerly known as Yarborough, Dadeville, Battles, and Narcissus, is an unincorporated community in Baldwin County, Alabama, United States.

History
Battles Wharf community has gone through a number of name changes. It was originally known as Yarborough, possibly in honor of a local family. The name was then changed to Dadeville to honor R. R. Dade. The name later changed to Battles, but due to another community in Alabama having a similar name, it was then renamed Narcissus, in honor of the figure from Greek mythology. Finally, the community became known as Battles Wharf. A post office operated under the name Battles from 1875 to 1903, under the name Narcissus from 1903 to 1904, and under the name Battles Wharf from 1904 to 1961.

References

Unincorporated communities in Alabama
Unincorporated communities in Baldwin County, Alabama